John Isaac "Junior" Hanna (April 5, 1935 – November 20, 2005) was a Canadian professional ice hockey defenceman and coach. Hanna is considered to be the first player in the National Hockey League (NHL) of Lebanese descent.

Hanna was born in Sydney, Nova Scotia. He played junior hockey for the Trois-Rivières Aigles and the Chicoutimi Sagueneens before signing a professional contract. He played 198 games in the NHL with the New York Rangers, Montreal Canadiens and Philadelphia Flyers. He also played 66 games in the World Hockey Association (WHA) with the Cleveland Crusaders. However, the majority of his career was spent in the minors with the Quebec Aces of the American Hockey League and the Seattle Totems of the Western Hockey League.

After retiring from competitive play, he was hired for several brief coaching stints in the AHL. He also served as head coach of the Cleveland Crusaders of the World Hockey Association for part of the 1974-74 season.

Hanna died of cancer on November 20, 2005.

Coaching stats

References

External links
 

1935 births
2005 deaths
Canadian ice hockey defencemen
Canadian people of Lebanese descent
Canadian people of Syrian descent
Deaths from cancer in Nova Scotia
Cleveland Crusaders players
Ice hockey people from Nova Scotia
Jacksonville Barons players
Montreal Canadiens players
New York Rangers players
People from Sydney, Nova Scotia
Philadelphia Flyers players
Providence Reds players
Quebec Aces (AHL) players
Seattle Totems (WHL) players
Southern Hockey League (1973–1977) coaches
Sportspeople from the Cape Breton Regional Municipality
Springfield Indians players
Syracuse Eagles players
Sportspeople of Lebanese descent